The following is a list of notable deaths in March 2004.

Entries for each day are listed alphabetically by surname. A typical entry lists information in the following sequence:
 Name, age, country of citizenship at birth, subsequent country of citizenship (if applicable), reason for notability, cause of death (if known), and reference.

March 2004

1
Barbara Frawley, 68, Australian actress (Dot and the Kangaroo).
Riet van Grunsven, 85, member of the Dutch Resistance during World War II.
Mian Ghulam Jilani, 91, Pakistan Army officer, died at his home in Fairfax, Virginia on 1 March 2004.
Leon Katz (physicist), 94, Canadian physicist.
Costas Montis, 90, Cypriot poet, novelist, and playwright, tuberculosis.
Gilbert Plass, 83, Canadian physicist.
Johnny Walker (DJ), 55, American radio personality, lung cancer.

2
William J. Bouwsma, 80, American historian.
Tony Lee, 69, British jazz pianist, cancer.
Mercedes McCambridge, 87, American actress (All the King's Men, Giant, The Exorcist), Oscar winner (1950).
Marge Schott, 75, American primary owner of the Cincinnati Reds.

3
Cecily Adams, 46, American casting director (That '70s Show, 3rd Rock from the Sun) and actress (Star Trek: Deep Space Nine), lung cancer.
Susan Moller Okin, 57, New Zealand liberal feminist political philosopher.
Pedro Pietri, 59, Puerto Rican-American Nuyorican poet and playwright, stomach cancer.
Muniswamy Rajgopal, 77, Indian Olympic field hockey player (gold medal winner in men's field hockey at the 1952 Summer Olympics).
Drake Sather, 44, American Emmy nominated television writer (Dennis Miller Show, The Larry Sanders Show, Saturday Night Live, Zoolander).
Luis Villalta, 35, Peruvian professional boxer.
Russell Weigley, 73, American professor and military historian.

4
Max Arias-Schreiber Pezet, 81, Peruvian lawyer and politician.
Meryle Fitzgerald, 79, American baseball player (AAGPBL).
Jake Hancock, 75, British geologist.
Arthur Kinsella, 86, New Zealand politician, Minister of Education (1963–1969).
John McGeoch, 48, British guitarist (Magazine, Siouxsie and the Banshees and PiL).
Claude Nougaro, 74, French songwriter and singer.
George Pake, 79, American physicist and computer research executive, known for founding Xerox PARC.
Sir Malcolm Pasley, 77, British literary scholar.
Halina Perez, 22, Filipina actress.
Stephen Sprouse, 50, American artist and fashion designer.
 Dale Ishimoto, 80, American actor.

5
Carlos Julio Arosemena Monroy, 84, Ecuadorian politician, President (1961–1963).
Percy Browne, 80, British MP, jockey and farmer.
Julito Collazo, 78, Cuban Master Percussionist.
Walt Gorney, 91, Austrian-American actor (Friday the 13th, Trading Places).
Stanisław Musiał, 65, Polish priest.
Mike O'Callaghan, 74, American politician, Governor of Nevada (1971–1979).

6
Eugene T. Booth, 91, American nuclear physicist.
Frances Dee, 94, American actress.
Ray Fernandez, 47, American professional wrestler best known as "Hercules Hernandez" or simply just "Hercules".
Sir Alexander Glen, 91, Scottish explorer and businessman.
Val Pinchbeck, 73, American NFL broadcasting executive.
Alan Short, 83, American California legislator, co-author of the Short-Doyle Mental Health Act.
John Henry Williams, 35, American controversial son of baseball great Ted Williams.

7
Nicolae Cajal, 84, Romanian physician and politician.
Michael Stringer, 79, British production designer and art director (Casino Royale, Fiddler on the Roof, 633 Squadron).
George Thompson, 78, British footballer.
Paul Winfield, 62, American actor (Sounder, The Terminator, 227), Emmy winner (1995).

8
János Bognár, 89, Hungarian Olympic cyclist.
Sivaramakrishna Chandrasekhar, 73, Indian physicist.
Keith Hopkins, 69, British ancient historian and sociologist.
Robin Hunter, 74, British actor.
Robert Pastorelli, 49, American actor (Murphy Brown, Eraser, Michael), drug overdose.
Muhammad Zaidan, (aka Abu Abbas), 55, Palestinian nationalist, founder of Palestine Liberation Front.

9
Rust Epique, 35, American songwriter and guitarist.
Marshall Frady, 64, American journalist, cancer.
Albert Mol, 87, Dutch author, dancer, cabaret performer, actor, TV personality.
Coleridge-Taylor Perkinson, 71, American composer, conductor and pianist, created sonatas, concertos and symphonies.
Don Smith, 52, American professional basketball player (Philadelphia 76ers).

10
Herbert Choy, 88, American federal judge.
Jack Creley, 78, American-born Canadian actor.
Robert D. Orr, 86, American politician, former Governor of Indiana.
James Parrish, 35, American NFL player (San Francisco 49ers, Pittsburgh Steelers, New York Jets).
Hansjörg Schlager, 74, German Olympic alpine skier (men's downhill and men's slalom at the 1972 Winter Olympics).
Dave Schulthise, 47, American bass guitarist for the punk band The Dead Milkmen.
David Shoenberg, 93, British physicist (solid-state electronics, magnetic resonance imaging, superconductivity).
Wilhelm von Homburg, 63, German boxer and actor (Die Hard, Stroszek, Ghostbusters II), prostate cancer.

11
Philip Arthur Fisher, 96, American stock investor and author of Common Stocks and Uncommon Profits.
Seymour Geisser, 74, American statistician, DNA-evidence expert.
Adrian Ropes, 62, English television actor.
J. Minos Simon, 82, American author,  aviator and attorney.
Edmund Sylvers, 47, American lead singer of The Sylvers, lung cancer.

12
Finn Carling, 78, Norwegian author and playwright with cerebral palsy.
Yvonne Cernota, 24, German bobsled driver, in training accident.
Cid Corman, 79, Japan-based American poet and translator.
Bates Lowry, 80, American art historian and museum director.
Olavo Martins de Oliveira, 76, Brazilian footballer.
Milton Resnick, 87, Ukrainian-American artist, suicide.
Sylvi Saimo, 89, Finnish Olympic canoer (women's K-1 500 metre canoeing: 1948, 1952 gold medal winner).
Sir William Wade, 86, British legal scholar.

13
Sydney Carter, 88, British musician and poet.
Chen Hansheng, 107, Chinese sociologist.
Franz König, 98, Austrian cardinal.
Dullah Omar, 69, South African cabinet minister.

14
Alishan Bairamian, 89, Armenian-American intellectual, historian, and author.
Siradiou Diallo, 67, Guinean journalist and politician, cardiac arrest.
Martin Emond, 34, New Zealand cartoon illustrator and painter, suicide by hanging.
Norb Hecker, 76, American football player and coach.
René Laloux, 74, French animator and film director, heart attack.
John W. Seybold, 88, American pioneer in computer typesetting.

15
Amparo Arrebato, 59, Colombian dancer.
George Briggs, 93, British Anglican prelate, first Bishop of The Seychelles.
Chuck Niles, 76, American Southern California jazz radio disc jockey, awarded a star on the Hollywood Walk of Fame.
Patrick Nuttgens, 74, British architect.
William Pickering, 93, New Zealand engineer, head of Jet Propulsion Laboratory.
Sir John Pople, 78, British theoretical chemist and Nobel Prize winner.
J. Wayne Streilein, 68, American immunologist and eye tissue transplant researcher, known as "The Father of Modern Ocular Immunology".
John Vallone, 50, American production designer (Star Trek: The Motion Picture, Predator, 48 Hrs.).

16
Brian Bianchini, 25, American fashion model.
Shamseddin Seyed-Abbasi, 61, Iranian Olympic wrestler (bronze medal winner in men's freestyle featherweight wrestling at the 1968 Summer Olympics).
Vilém Tauský, 94, Czech conductor and composer.

17
Rachel Hudson, 20, British domestic abuse victim, murdered.
J. J. Jackson, 62, American radio and television personality, former MTV video jockey.
Monique Laederach, 65, Swiss writer.
Michael Mellinger, 74, German actor.
Bernie Scherer, 91, American professional football player (University of Nebraska, Green Bay Packers, Pittsburgh Pirates).

18
Gene Bearden, 83, American baseball player with the Cleveland Indians.
Vytas Brenner, 57, Venezuelan musician, keyboardist and composer.
Wallace Davenport, 78, American jazz trumpeter.
Richard Marner, 82, Russian-born British actor.
Harrison McCain, 76, Canadian businessman, founder of McCain Foods.
Raquel Rodrigo, 89, Cuban actress and singer.

19
Brian Maxwell, 51, Canadian long-distance runner and founder of PowerBar.
Sir Horace Phillips, 86, British diplomat.
Guillermo Rivas, 76, Mexican comedy actor.
Mitchell Sharp, 92, Canadian Liberal cabinet minister (member of Parliament, Minister of Foreign Affairs, Minister of Finance).
Ladislaus Simacek, 90, Austrian Olympic middle-distance runner (men's 3000 metres steeplechase at the 1936 Summer Olympics).
Ted Walker, 69, British poet and dramatist.

20
Scott Fraser, 33, Canadian professional racing driver.
Charles Harold Haden II, 66, American jurist.
Chosuke Ikariya, 72, Japanese comedian, actor and leader of comedic group The Drifters.
Juliana, 94, Dutch Royal, former Queen of the Netherlands.
Jean-François Ravelinghien, 56, French Olympic swimmer (men's 400 metre freestyle and men's 1500 metre freestyle at the 1968 Summer Olympics).
Joakim Segedi, 99, Serbian-born Croatian Greek-Catholic hierarch, Auxiliary Bishop of Križevci (1963–1984)
Pierre Sévigny, 86, Canadian member of Parliament (House of Commons representing Longueuil—Saint-Hubert, Quebec), known for Munsinger Affair.

21
Sir Austin Pearce, 82, British industrialist, (British Aerospace).
Mirwais Sadiq, Afghan politician, Civil Aviation Minister for Afghanistan.
Robert Snyder, 88, American documentary filmmaker (winner of Academy Award for Best Documentary Feature for The Titan: Story of Michelangelo).
Ludmilla Tchérina, 79, French ballerina, actress and writer.
John C. West, 81, American politician and diplomat.

22
John Bradley, 86, Canadian physician.
Peter Jackson, 73, British rugby union player.
David Oates, 77, British archaeologist.
Sheikh Ahmed Yassin, 67, Palestinian spiritual leader and founder of Hamas.

23
Rupert Hamer, 87, Australian politician, heart failure.
Otto Kumm, 94, German divisional commander in the Waffen-SS during WWII.
L. S. Stavrianos, 91, Greek-Canadian historian.
Andrew Veniamin, 28, Australian criminal, shot.
Chen Zhongwei, 74, Chinese surgeon.

24
Dominic Agostino, 44, Canadian politician, Ontario Liberal MPP.
Michael Garrison, 47, American ambient musician, liver failure.
Fernando da Costa Novaes, 76, Brazilian ornithologist.
Mildred Jeffrey, 93, American political and social activist.
Fred Sharaga, 94, American Olympic racewalker (men's 10 kilometres racewalk at the 1948 Summer Olympics).

25
Sir David Griffin, 88, Australian lawyer, businessman and politician.
Clayton Matthews, 85, American writer.
Kristine Vetulani-Belfoure, 79, Polish  teacher and writer, heart failure.

26
Jan Berry, 62, American musician, the 'Jan' of Jan and Dean.
Takeshi Kamo, 89, Japanese footballer.
Fred Karlin, 67, American composer of feature films and television movie scores, cancer.
Bertrand de Montaudoin, 79, French Olympic modern pentathlete.
J. Edward Roush, 83, American politician (U.S. Representative for Indiana's 5th congressional district and Indiana's 4th congressional district).
Jan Sterling, 82, American actress (The High and the Mighty, Ace in the Hole, Pony Express).
Colin Sutton, 65, British police officer.

27
Bob Cremins, 98, American baseball player (Boston Red Sox).
Zhang Haoruo, 72, Chinese politician, Governor of Sichuan.
Einar Magnussen, 72, Norwegian economist and politician.
Robert Merle, 95, French author.
Edward Piszek, 87, American industrialist and philanthropist, founded Mrs. Paul's food brand.
John Sack, 74, American journalist and war correspondent (Korea, Vietnam, Iraq, Yugoslavia and Afghanistan).
Lionel Sackville-West, 6th Baron Sackville, 90, British stockbroker and aristocrat.
Larry Trask, 59, American–born British linguist and expert on the Basques.
Kenneth Edward Untener, American Roman Catholic perelate, Bishop of Saginaw.
James Wapakhabulo, 59, Ugandan politician, foreign minister of Uganda.

28
Percy Beames, 92, Australian sportsman and journalist.
Albert Brülls, 67, German footballer.
Erich Hauser, 73, German sculptor.
Art James, 74, American game show host and announcer.
David Robinson, 75, Irish horticulturist.
Adán Sánchez, 19, Mexican singer, car accident.
Ljubiša Spajić, 78, Yugoslavian football player and manager.
Sir Peter Ustinov, 82, British actor (Spartacus, Topkapi, Death on the Nile), Oscar winner (1961, 1965).

29
Lise de Baissac, 98, Mauritian-born British Special Operations Executive agent.
Chen Yi-hsiung, Taiwanese failed assassin in the 3-19 shooting incident.
Al Cuccinello, 89, American baseball player (New York Giants).
Colin Smith, 69, English jazz trumpeter.

30
Alistair Cooke, 95, British-born American BBC broadcaster and transatlantic commentator.
Erick Friedman, 64, American concert violinist, violin professor at Yale University.
Hubert Gregg, 89, English BBC broadcaster.
Michael King, 58, New Zealand historian.
William Wickline, 52, American serial killer, execution by lethal injection.
Timi Yuro, 63, American singer-songwrite, throat cancer.

31
René Gruau, 95, Italian fashion illustrator.
Hedi Lang, 72, Swiss politician, first woman to preside over the Swiss National Council.
Sir John Warburton Paul, 88, British colonial administrator.

References 

2004-03
 03